The Pickering Medal is awarded annually by the Royal Society Te Apārangi to a person or team "who, while in New Zealand, has through design, development or invention performed innovative work the results of which have been significant in their influence and recognition both nationally and internationally, or which have led to significant commercial success". 

The award is named for Sir William (Bill) Pickering. The front of the medal features the head of Bill Pickering, with the words technology, innovation, excellence inscribed round the edge, while the obverse features the Royal Society coat of arms. Up until 2012, the medal was accompanied by a prize of $15,000.

Recipients

References 

Royal Society of New Zealand
New Zealand science and technology awards
Science and technology in New Zealand
Awards established in 2004